The Vampire Diaries is an American supernatural horror romance television series created by Kevin Williamson based on the novels of the same name by author L. J. Smith. It was officially picked up for the 2009–10 season on May 19, 2009. It premiered on September 10, 2009, on The CW and received the highest ratings for a series premiere in the network's history at that point, scoring 4.91million live viewers.

The series focuses on the fictional town of Mystic Falls, Virginia, that is charged with supernatural history. It follows Elena Gilbert portrayed by Nina Dobrev as she begins to get over her parents' death, when two vampires pull her into a world she didn't know before, Stefan and Damon Salvatore, portrayed by Paul Wesley and Ian Somerhalder, respectively. Kayla Ewell portrayed Vicki Donovan for the first seven episodes until her character was killed off. Matt Davis was later cast as a history teacher in a recurring role to fill the void. He was later upgraded to series regular status. The season concluded on May 13, 2010, and consisted of 22 episodes.

Cast

Starring

Nina Dobrev as Elena Gilbert / Katherine Pierce
Paul Wesley as Stefan Salvatore
Ian Somerhalder as Damon Salvatore
Steven R. McQueen as Jeremy Gilbert
Sara Canning as Jenna Sommers
Kat Graham as Bonnie Bennett
Candice Accola as Caroline Forbes
Zach Roerig as Matt Donovan
Kayla Ewell as Vicki Donovan
Michael Trevino as Tyler Lockwood
Matt Davis as Alaric Saltzman

Recurring

Malese Jow as Anna
Marguerite MacIntyre as Liz Forbes
Robert Pralgo as Richard Lockwood
Kelly Hu as Pearl
Susan Walters as Carol Lockwood
Chris Johnson as Logan Fell
Jasmine Guy as Sheila Bennett
David Anders as John Gilbert
Sterling Sulieman as Harper
Chris William Martin as Zach Salvatore
Bianca Lawson as Emily Bennett
Melinda Clarke as Kelly Donovan
Mia Kirshner as Isobel Flemming

Guest

Benjamin Ayres as William Tanner
Sean Faris as Ben McKittrick
Stephen Martines as Frederick
James Remar as Giuseppe Salvatore
Arielle Kebbel as Lexi Branson
Gina Torres as Bree
Brandon Quinn as Lee
Dillon Casey as Noah
Amanda Detmer as Trudie Peterson
Spencer Locke as Amber Bradley
Mike Erwin as Charlie
David Anders as John Gilbert
Cindy Busby as Brooke Fenton

Notes

Episodes

Production
On February 6, 2009, Variety announced that The CW had greenlit the pilot for The Vampire Diaries with Kevin Williamson and Julie Plec set as the head writers and executive producers. On May 19, 2009, the series was officially ordered for the 2009–2010 season.

The pilot was filmed in Vancouver, but the rest of the episodes have been filmed in Covington, Georgia (which doubles as the fictional small town of Mystic Falls, Virginia) and various other communities around Greater Atlanta. The series was given a full, 22-episode order on October 31, 2009, after strong ratings for the first half of the season.

Storylines
The season begins after the deaths of Elena and Jeremy Gilbert's parents. Both are put in their Aunt Jenna's custody. Jeremy has become a loner and Elena starts dating a boy named Stefan Salvatore. It is soon revealed that Stefan is a vampire and his brother Damon shows up in Mystic Falls and kills people at random.
 
Another supernatural revelation occurs when Elena's friend Bonnie Bennett discovers she is born into a line of witches and is a witch herself. She gets help from her grandmother to use her powers. Elena's friends and acquaintances also become involved such as Tyler Lockwood, son of the mayor, and Matt Donovan, Elena's ex-boyfriend and Caroline Forbes, daughter of the sheriff. It also turns out that Elena is the doppelganger of Katherine Pierce, a woman who, centuries ago, seduced the Salvatore brothers and turned them into vampires, turning their vampire hunting father against them, though Stefan ends up killing him. Katherine was presumably trapped in a tomb beneath the church and Damon is planning on releasing her. Lexi, a friend of Stefan's shows up and befriends Elena, but is killed by Damon, driving a wedge between brothers. 

Jeremy falls in love with Vicki Donovan, Matt's sister, who uses drugs like him, but she was dating Tyler and starts a rivalry between the boys. Vicki breaks up with Tyler for Jeremy. She is later turned into a vampire by Damon, but her bloodlust was out of control and she is killed by Stefan. Jeremy witnesses this and Elena asks Damon to make Jeremy forget this to spare him the pain. Matt on the other hand is devastated.

After the history teacher is killed, a man named Alaric is hired to take his place. Alaric came to town to kill Damon, believing him to have killed his wife, Isobel. Damon tries to kill him in self-defense, but Alaric wears a ring that keeps him from dying at supernatural hands. It is revealed Damon didn't kill Isobel, but turned her into a vampire on her own account. Later, Alaric and Damon become friends. 

At one point, Damon finds the tomb under the church, and has Bonnie and her grandmother help open it to find Katherine. During the search, a number of vampires escape, and it is discovered Katherine already escaped long ago. The tomb vampires are led by a female vampire named Pearl and her daughter Anna. Bonnie's grand mother dies and Bonnie begins to resent vampires. It also turns out a group called the Founder's Council know of the vampires and wish to kill them. The council is led by Tyler's abusive father, Richard Lockwood. Caroline's mother, Sheriff Elizabeth Forbes is also a member, despite being friends with Damon, unknown that he is a vampire. Anna also starts a relationship with Jeremy. Jenna also starts dating a man named Logan, who cheated on her in the past. Soon, Logan is turned into a vampire by Anna, and is killed by Alaric, who tells her he left town. From that point Jenna starts dating Alaric.

It is not long before Elena and Jeremy's uncle John, who they grew up hating shows up. John is working for the council. The Council wish to use the Gilbert device to kill all vampires in Mystic Falls. Damon tries to kill John, but he is wearing a ring similar to Alaric's. It is revealed that John and Isobel, Alaric's vampire wife, are Elena's biological parents, they had Elena adopted by John's brother for her protection. It turns out they are also working for Katherine, and are using Mayor Lockwood and the others as pawns, although Isobel tells Elena their unofficial goal is to protect her.

In the seasons climax, during Founders day, Richard and John execute their plan to kill the vampires, both willing to use innocent people as collateral damage. Sheriff Forbes tries to oppose their plan, but is knocked out by John and chained up. John uses the local police who are in on the scheme as foot soldiers. The device is activated and the vampires are neutralized and taken away to be burnt in a basement, but Tyler is affected by the device as he had supernatural genes himself (later revealed to be werewolf); since Richard has these genes, the deputies think he is a vampire and lock him in the basement where he is burnt alive and killed by the vampires. Richard's wife, Carol goes to the station to rescue the sheriff but they are unable to save Richard. John also kills Anna, so Jeremy, not wanting to deal with the pain tries to become a vampire via Anna's blood. During the fiasco, Caroline is in a car accident, Elena also confronts John with the knowledge that he's her father and Bonnie rescues the Salvatore brothers, letting them off with a warning so Damon doesn't kill anyone innocent.

Sheriff Forbes finds her daughter has been injured and goes to the hospital where she is comforted by Damon. John heads home and finds Katherine, who is posing as Elena. Katherine stabs John several times and severs his ring finger and leaves him to die. As Katherine leaves, Elena comes in and finds her father injured.

Reception

Critical response
Based on 28 reviews, the 1st season currently holds a 71% on Rotten Tomatoes with an average rating of 6.91 out of 10. The site's critics consensus reads, "It's not particularly innovative and there's a lot of angsty brooding going on, but there's a self-referential cheekiness in The Vampire Diaries that will appeal directly to its target audience."

The initial reception of the show was mixed, Entertainment Weekly gave the pilot a B+, stating that the show "signals a welcome return to form for writer-producer Kevin Williamson". They end by saying that "Diaries promises us a season of sharp-tongued amusement." Metacritic gave the show a score of 50/100 based on 22 critical reviews, indicating "mixed or average reviews".

Many critics felt that the series improved with each episode. Sarah Hughes of The Independent says The Vampire Diaries turns into "a well-crafted, interestingly developed series" despite a poor opening episode. The New York Post also praised the portrayal of Elena, finding the character to be a strong-minded woman who doesn't allow her feelings for her boyfriend to control her. The San Diego Union-Tribune said: "The supernatural drama is a first-class production, featuring an insanely gorgeous cast, sharp scripts and a brooding vibe that is hard for even the most levelheaded adult to resist." Mike Hale of The New York Times gave the series an honorable mention on his list of the top TV shows of 2009.

The Vampire Diaries premiered on September 10, 2009, and gave The CW its biggest series premiere ratings in its network history scoring 4.9 million viewers. Adding in DVR numbers, the ratings for the premiere increased to 5.7 million viewers. Although ratings decreased as the season went on, it reached a series high in adults 18–34 (2.3/7) on October 29, with the broadcast of its Halloween episode. Including DVR ratings the second episode brought in 4.7 million viewers, the third 4.6 million, the fourth 4.3 million, the fifth 4.4 million, the sixth 4.6 million, the ninth 4.9 million, and 4.3 million viewers for the fifteenth episode.

Vampire Diaries Season 1 aired in Urdu Language in Pakistan on FILMAX. The series was the No. 1 show on The CW for the 2009–10 season averaging 3.60 million viewers weekly, thus becoming the first show to overtake America's Next Top Model which had been The CW's No. 1 show since the network began in 2006.

Ratings

Accolades
For its first season The Vampire Diaries won seven Teen Choice Awards and one People's Choice Award.

Home media releases 
Season one was released on DVD in Regions 1, 2 and 4 and on Blu-ray in Regions A and B. Both United States versions include commentary by cast and crew members on selected episodes, deleted scenes, behind-the-scenes featurettes, webisodes, and a downloadable audiobook of L.J. Smith's The Vampire Diaries: The Awakening. It was released on DVD in Region 2 on August 23, 2010. Following that release, Region 1 began selling DVDs on August 31, 2010, and Region 4 on September 1, 2010. In Region A, it was released on Blu-ray on August 31, 2010. Region B's releases varied; United Kingdom on August 23, 2010, Brazil on August 26, 2010, and Australia on September 1, 2010.

References 

1
2009 American television seasons
2010 American television seasons